Family Album is the 2004 studio album by Faun Fables. It was released through the label Drag City.

Track listing
"Eyes of a Bird" - 7:30
"Poem 2" - 2:40
"A Mother and a Piano" - 4:52
"Lucy Belle" - 3:58
"Joshua" - 4:03
"Nop of Time" - 2:09
"Still Here" - 4:28
"Preview" - 4:53
"Higher" - 4:52
"Carousel with Madonnas" - 2:39
"Rising Din" - 4:32
"Fear March" - 2:21
"Eternal" - 2:52
"Mouse Song" - 3:26
"Old and Light" - 4:03

References

External links
Official Faun Fables web site 

Faun Fables albums
2004 albums
Drag City (record label) albums